Capehart is an unincorporated community in Steele Township, Daviess County, Indiana, United States.

Geography

References

Unincorporated communities in Daviess County, Indiana
Unincorporated communities in Indiana